The Los Angeles Westside is an urban region in western Los Angeles County, California.  It has no official definition, but sources like LA Weekly and the Mapping L.A. survey of the Los Angeles Times place the region on the western side of the Los Angeles Basin south of the Santa Monica Mountains.

Geography

LA Weekly

According to the LA Weekly, there are different perspectives on where the Westside ends and the Eastside begins. Generally, the Westside is the area south of the Santa Monica Mountains and Sepulveda Pass, and west of either:

 Downtown Los Angeles – a historic definition supported by UCLA urban and cultural historian Eric Avila. Most of the number streets and big boulevards get a “west” before their names west of Main Street and an east if they are “east” of Main Street.
 The 110 Freeway
 La Cienega Boulevard
 The 405 Freeway

Mapping L.A. boundaries

Los Angeles Times readers submitted more than 300 maps, with borders ranging from Lincoln to La Brea and beyond. The most common east/west dividing lines were: Downtown, La Cienega Boulevard (the most common street cited), and the 405 freeway (the most common answer).

The Times analyzed the results and no one definition approached a majority. Ultimately, the Los Angeles Times Mapping Project settled on a definition comprising , encompassing not only districts in the city of Los Angeles but also two unincorporated neighborhoods, plus the cities of Beverly Hills, Culver City, and Santa Monica, but excluding all of the city of West Hollywood – even areas west of La Cienega Boulevard.

Neighborhoods and districts

According to the Mapping L.A. survey of the Los Angeles Times the Westside includes all of the below neighborhoods:

Bel Air
Beverly Crest
Beverlywood
Beverly Grove
Brentwood
Century City
Del Rey
Cheviot Hills
Mar Vista
Pacific Palisades
La Cienega Heights
Palms
Pico-Robertson
Playa del Rey
Playa Vista
Rancho Park
Sawtelle
Venice
West Los Angeles
Westchester
Westwood

Other cities

Beverly Hills
Culver City
Malibu
Santa Monica
West Hollywood

Unincorporated areas
Ladera Heights
Marina del Rey
Alsace

Population
In the 2000 census, the Westside (as defined by the Los Angeles Times Mapping Project) had a population of 529,427. In 2000, non-Hispanic whites made up 63% of the population. The areas within the city of Los Angeles that Los Angeles Almanac recognized as part of the Westside had a population of 413,351.

Education
Fifty-three percent of West Los Angeles residents aged 25 and older had earned a 4-year degree by 2000, according to Census Bureau figures quoted by the Los Angeles Times. They included 89,620 people with master's degrees or higher and 117,695 with bachelor's degrees. In addition, 95,187 people in that age range had some college experience. There were 46,823 with high school diplomas but 40,451 who had dropped out before graduating. As of 2019, the median income of the neighborhood was about $96,300.

The Westside is home to the University of California, Los Angeles (UCLA), a public research university in the Westwood neighborhood. It is the second-oldest of the ten campuses of the University of California system. UCLA is considered a flagship campus of the University of California system, along with UC Berkeley. It offers undergraduate and graduate degree programs in a wide range of disciplines. With an approximate enrollment of 28,000 undergraduate and 12,000 graduate students, UCLA is the university with the largest enrollment in the state of California and the most popular university in the United States by number of applicants.

Other post-secondary schools in the Westside are as follows:
Otis College of Art and DesignSanta Monica College,  first opened in 1929 as Santa Monica Junior College. Current enrollment is over 30,000 students in more than 90 fields of study.West Los Angeles College, which offers associate degrees, vocationally oriented programs and transfer programs to four-year universities.

See alsoOther regions of Los Angeles County'''

Angeles National Forest
Antelope Valley
Central Los Angeles
Eastside
Harbor
Northeast Los Angeles
Northwest County
Pomona Valley
San Fernando Valley
San Gabriel Valley
South Bay
Santa Monica Mountains
South Los Angeles
Southeast County
Verdugos
Westside

References

External links

 
Los Angeles County, California regions
Populated coastal places in California